Glyphipterix paradisea is a species of sedge moth in the genus Glyphipterix. It was described by Walsingham in 1897. It is found in the West Indies.

References

Moths described in 1897
Glyphipterigidae
Moths of the Caribbean